Victoria Noel Galindo-Piatt (born December 22, 1983), commonly known as Vicky Galindo, is an American, former collegiate All-American, medal-winning Olympian, three-time professional All-Star, softball player and current head coach at West Valley College. An infielder at second and third, Galindo played college softball at West Valley and later for California in the Pac-12 Conference, helping them to back-to-back national runner-up finishes at the 2003 and 2004 Women's College World Series. She was drafted to the Chicago Bandits of National Pro Fastpitch (NPF) winning two championships. She also played for the United States women's national softball team, winning a silver medal at the 2008 Summer Olympics.

Career
Galindo played for the University of California, Berkeley Golden Bears from 2003–2005 and for West Valley Junior College for the 2002 season.  She was an undergrad assistant at Cal in 2006. Galindo was on the US national team from 2005-2007. She was also the assistant coach for the San Jose State in 2007.  In 2009 she took the head coaching position at West Valley College and became an associate faculty member.  She was hired full time in 2014, and teaches in the Kinesiology Department as the lead Pilates certificate instructor.  She went to high school at James Logan High School in Union City, California where she graduated in 2001. Galindo started playing at age 4 when her dad coached her brother's baseball team. There was an extra jersey and he told her to go play.

She was inducted to the Cal Hall of Fame in 2015, and her Jersey was retired in 2013 from the NPF Chicago Bandits.  

In 2014, she married Eddie Piatt. The couple have three children together.

James Logan High School
Vicky was the 2001 Best All Around Female Athlete her senior year.

She was inducted into the James Logan Hall of Fame in 2009, and her softball jersey was retired in 2012.

Statistics

College Softball

2002 Freshman Year
 Led West Valley Junior College to the state championship title
 Earned All-American honors
 First team all-league
 .510 batting average

2003 Sophomore Year
 Named to the All-CWS tournament team
 All-region recognition after hitting .462 (6-13)
 Garnered All-Pacific Region second team honors
 Second among Bears in hitting, posting a .324 average
 73 hits were the fifth highest total among Pac-10 players
 Posted 19 regular season multi-hit games

2004 Junior Year
 Member of USA Schutt Elite Team at Canada Cup and Champions Cup
Hit .415 (22-53) with 12 runs and a team-high five doubles and 12 RBI
 Led the Cal Bears to the WCWS runner-up
 Second team All-Pac-10
 First team All-American
 First team All Pacific Region

2005 Senior Year
 Led the Cal Bears to the Women's College World Series
 Pac-10 Conference Honors
 First-Team All-American

US National Team

2005

 International Sports Invitational Champion
 Hit. 889
 Gold medalist at Pan Am qualifier
 Silver medalist at World Cup
 Hit .455 (5-11) for a team-high seven RBI
 Silver medalist at Japan Cup
 Hit .273 (3-11) with one RBI

2006
 Undergrad assistant for Cal Bears
 Gold Medalist at World Cup of Softball

 2007

 Assistant Coach at San Jose State
 Gold medalist at World Cup.

Note: she batted .467 (7-15) for Team USA in the 2007 World Cup where she has played in all but one game. She appeared as a pinch runner for Crystl Bustos in the game she did not start.

References

External links
 
 Vicky Galindo - US National Team bio
 
 

1983 births
Living people
American softball coaches
California Golden Bears softball players
California Golden Bears softball coaches
Chicago Bandits players
West Valley Vikings softball players
West Valley Vikings softball coaches
San Jose State Spartans softball coaches
Olympic softball players of the United States
Olympic silver medalists for the United States in softball
Softball players at the 2008 Summer Olympics
Medalists at the 2008 Summer Olympics
Softball players at the 2007 Pan American Games
Bisexual sportspeople
Bisexual women
LGBT people from California
American LGBT sportspeople
People from Union City, California
Softball players from California
LGBT softball players
Pan American Games competitors for the United States